Sheila Chandra (born 14 March 1965) is a retired English pop singer of Indian descent. She is no longer able to perform, as the result of burning mouth syndrome which she has had since 2010.

Indian–Western pop fusion period
Sheila Chandra was born in Waterloo, London, England.  She first came to public attention as an actress, playing Sudhamani Patel in the BBC school drama Grange Hill from 1979 to 1981.

As a teenager she formed the band Monsoon with Steve Coe (who became the band's producer) and bassist Martin Smith. Monsoon created a fusion of Western and Indian pop styles. The band recorded its only album, Third Eye, in 1982 from which it had a hit single, "Ever So Lonely", which peaked at No. 12 in the UK Singles Chart. Monsoon followed-up with the single "Shakti," which peaked at No. 41, but this was to be the band's final charting single. The album also includes a cover of the Beatles' "Tomorrow Never Knows", featuring the distinctive EBow guitar sound of Bill Nelson. Resenting pressure from their record company over musical direction, Monsoon dissolved in 1982 and Coe and Smith set about promoting Chandra as a solo artist on independent Indipop Records.

Chandra went on to release a number of albums in the 1980s, at times experimenting with her voice as an instrument through a range of techniques. After a creative split with Martin Smith, Chandra released three albums on Peter Gabriel's Real World label —Weaving My Ancestors' Voices (1992), The Zen Kiss (1994), and ABoneCroneDrone (1996).

Shift to solo voice and drone style
In the 1990s Chandra decided, having been a studio artist exclusively, to give concerts for the first time, and concurrently released a trilogy of albums on Peter Gabriel's Real World label. These were in the minimalist solo voice and drone style, which she developed especially for live performances, so that she could perform alone on stage with only the occasional taped drone for accompaniment. Martin Smith was no longer actively involved by this time. Drawing on similarities of structure between Indian ragas and English folk melodies, she started to incorporate many British and Irish traditional songs and techniques, as well as other vocal styles and techniques from around the world.

Later projects

In 1990, Chandra interrupted her sabbatical to record a single, "Raining", with the folk-synth band Ancient Beatbox which also appeared on its self-titled album.

In 2000, she contributed two tracks, one a cover version of Tim Buckley's "Song to the Siren" and the other a remix of her solo track "Ever So Lonely/Eyes/Ocean" by Stephen Haig, to the album Gifted on Real World Records.

In 2001, she released a collaborative album with the Ganges Orchestra titled This Sentence is True (The Previous Sentence is False) based on her two experimental EPs with that group.

2002 saw the release of a remix of her original hit single "Ever So Lonely" (written by Steve Coe), retitled "So Lonely", by the DJ Jakatta. It charted at No. 8 in the UK. In 2002 she performed a song titled "Breath of Life" (retitled "The Grace of Valar" in its 2006 release) with Howard Shore for The Lord of the Rings: The Two Towers soundtrack.

In 2007, she recorded two songs for Simon Emmerson's project The Imagined Village, which set out to reinterpret traditional British songs using a wide range of contemporary British musicians. She also appeared with the Imagined Village on a concert tour of Britain in 2007.

Retirement from music 
In 2009, Chandra began experiencing symptoms of what was eventually diagnosed as BMS (burning mouth syndrome), as a result of which she is unable to sing, speak, laugh or cry without suffering intense pain. She has thus been rendered effectively mute. As a result of her illness Chandra retired from music. She turned her attention to writing self-help books, the first of which, Banish Clutter Forever – How the Toothbrush Principle Will Change Your Life, was published in 2010.

Discography

Albums
With Monsoon:
 Third Eye (1982) (retitled Monsoon featuring Sheila Chandra in 1995)
With the Ganges Orchestra:
 This Sentence is True (The Previous Sentence is False) (2001)
 EEP1 & EEP2 (2012)
 Pure Drones, Vol. I (2013)
 Pure Drones, Vol. II (2013)
 Pure Drones, Vol. III (2013)
Solo:
 Out on My Own (1984)
 Quiet  (1984)
 The Struggle (1985)
 Nada Brahma (1985)
 Roots and Wings (1990)
 Silk (compilation, 1991)
 Weaving My Ancestors' Voices (1992)
 The Zen Kiss (1994)
 ABoneCroneDrone (1996)
 Moonsung: A Real World Retrospective (compilation, 1999)
 The Indipop Retrospective (compilation, 2003)
 Archive (compilation, 2013)

Singles
With Monsoon:
 "Ever So Lonely" (1982)
 "Shakti (The Meaning of Within)" (1982)
 "Tomorrow Never Knows" (1982)
 "Wings of the Dawn (Prem Kavita)" (1982)
 "Ever So Lonely" (Remix by Ben Chapman) (1990)
 "So Lonely" ("Ever So Lonely" remixes by Jakatta) (2002)

Other
Solo:
 "Raining (My Eyes Are Filled with Clouds)" with Ancient Beatbox (1990)
 "Breath of Life" in The Lord of the Rings: The Two Towers (2002)
 "Arwen's Fate" in The Lord of the Rings: The Two Towers (2002)
 "Welcome Sailor" and "'Ouses, 'Ouses, 'Ouses" from The Imagined Village (2007)

Books
 Banish Clutter Forever – How the Toothbrush Principle Will Change Your Life (2010) 
 Organizing for Creative People (2017)

Interviews
 Mathur, Rakesh (1991). Nada Brahma; DEVI in Hinduism Today, August 1991.
 Schaefer, John (1993). Sheila Chandra's Interview with John Schaefer at WNYC 1993: Weaving My Ancestors' Voices.
 Schaefer, John (1996). Sheila Chandra's Interview with John Schaefer at WNYC 1996: ABoneCroneDrone.
 Prasad, Anil (2000). Sheila Chandra: Natural Extensions in Innerviews, 3 May 2000.
 Joe F. Compton (2000). "The Commonality is Brilliance...".
 Mite (2000). Sheila Chandra Interview in Mutant Renegade Zine No. 13, Winter 2000.
 Teropong (2008). Sheila Chandra in Womad Singapore, 23 August 2008.
 Millard, Rosie (2010). Another Fine Mess You've Got Me Out Of at Times Online
 Weaver, Andrew (2012). Peter Gabriel's Real World Records: interviews with Sheila Chandra, the Blind Boys of Alabama, Thomas Mapfumo and Yungchen Lhamo on cbcmusic.ca
 Prasad, Anil (2020). Sheila Chandra: State of Flow in Innerviews, 16 December 2020.

References

External links
Official website

 
 
 Sheila Chandra at Ectophiles' Guide to Good Music

1965 births
English women singers
English Hindus
English people of Indian descent
English self-help writers
English women writers
Living people
Singers from London
Writers from London
Real World Records artists
Mercury Records artists
Narada Productions artists
World music singers
English television actresses
British world music musicians